Neglecta, a Latin word meaning neglected, may refer to:

 Columba livia neglecta, Hume, 1873, a subspecies of the rock pigeon found in the mountains of eastern Central Asia
 Dermatosis neglecta, a skin condition due to an accumulation of sebum, keratin, sweat, dirt, and debris
 Monographella nivalis var. neglecta, a plant pathogen
 Nerodia erythrogaster neglecta, the copperbelly water snake
 Sturnella neglecta, the western meadowlark
 Neglecta (genus), a bacteria genus